Harvey Murphy (September 30, 1930 – February 5, 2018) was a physical education teacher at the University of North Carolina at Charlotte. After being appointed the head of the new university's physical education program by acting chancellor Bonnie Cone, Murphy served as the school's first-ever basketball coach from 1965 until 1970. During his tenure, the 49ers won the Dixie Conference championship in 1969 and 1970.

Head coaching record

References

1930 births
2018 deaths
American men's basketball coaches
Charlotte 49ers men's basketball coaches